Vallabhankunnu is a hill top in Pallikkal panchayat of Varkala Taluk in Thiruvananthapuram District of Kerala. It is situated 22 km east of Varkala and 17 km north of Kilimanoor.

References

Thiruvananthapuram district
Kerala
Hills of Kerala